Sidorenko is an East Slavic patronymic surname derived from the Ukrainian surname Sydorenko, meaning "descendant of Sydir/Sidor".
 Aleksandr Sidorenko (wrestler) (born 1972), Belarusian wrestler
 Alexandre Sidorenko (born 1988), French tennis player
 Alexey Sidorenko (born 1983), Kazakhstani beach volleyball player
 Dmitri Sidorenko (born 1973), Russian footballer
 Elizaveta Sidorenko (born 2003), Russian Paralympic swimmer
 Ivan Sidorenko (1919–1994), Red Army officer
 Kirill Sidorenko (born 1983), Russian ice hockey player
 Oleksandra Sidorenko, Polish boxer
 Pavel Sidorenko (born 1987), Kyrgyzstani footballer
 Tamara Maliukova Sidorenko (1919-2005), Ukrainian composer
 Tatyana Sidorenko (born 1966), Soviet volleyball player
 Vasiliy Sidorenko (born 1961), Soviet-Russian hammer thrower

See also
 

Russian-language surnames
Ukrainian-language surnames

Patronymic surnames